Tut Kari (also Romanized as Tūt Karī; also known as Tūt Khvorī, Tūt-e Khūrī, Tūt-e Kūrī, and Tūt-i-Kuri) is a village in Qohestan Rural District, Qohestan District, Darmian County, South Khorasan Province, Iran. At the 2006 census, its population was 53, in 16 families.

References 

Populated places in Darmian County